Cao Zhen (born January 8, 1987, in Shandong) is a Chinese table tennis player.

Career records
Singles (as of May 13, 2011)
World Championships: round of 16 (2005)
Pro Tour winner (5): Malaysia Open 2003; China (Wuxi) Open 2004; German, Swedish Open 2005; Slovenian Open 2009. Runner-up (2): Austrian Open 2004; German Open 2007.

Women's doubles
World Championships: QF (2009)
Pro Tour winner (5): Malaysia Open 2003; China (Wuxi), Austrian Open 2004; Japan Open 2005; Slovenian Open 2009. Runner-up (2): Danish, China (Tianjin) Open 2009.

Mixed doubles
World Championships: winner (2009, 11); SF (2005, 07)

References

Living people
1987 births
Table tennis players from Shandong
Chinese female table tennis players
People from Binzhou
World Table Tennis Championships medalists